Waimea Bay is located in Haleiwa on the North Shore of O'ahu in the Hawaiian Islands at the mouth of the Waimea River. Waimea Valley extends to the east of Waimea Bay. Waimea means "reddish water" in Hawaiian.

History

Captain Charles Clerke aboard  stopped at Waimea Bay on February 28, 1779. Clerke had shortly before taken command of the ship after Capt. James Cook was killed at Kealakekua Bay on February 14. Waimea Bay was the only O'ahu anchorage visited by the expedition.  Waimea Valley was densely populated at the time, and the remains of Pu'u o Mahuka, an important heiau (Hawaiian temple) can still be seen above the bay.

Geography
Pu'u o Mahuka Heiau State Monument is a Native Hawaiian historical site located just above the bay, off Pupukea Road. It is a historically important site on the North Shore, as well as providing a view of Waimea Bay and the Waianae Mountain range.

Waimea Bay is located along Kamehameha Highway. The bay is on the north-west side of the highway (at the entrance point).

The Waimea Bay shoreline has been experiencing erosion due to both man made and natural causes.

Surfing

In winter, Waimea and other North Shore locations such as Pipeline and Sunset Beach host a number of surfing contests because of the large waves found here.  These waves are created by winter storms in the North Pacific, and their arrival on O'ahu's North Shore is typically forecast accurately several days in advance. In summer, Waimea typically has clear and calm water.

The surf break at Waimea Bay was significant in the development of Big wave surfing.  Larger surf at the bay went unridden for years until November 7, 1957 when a handful of surfers finally paddled out and rode the giant waves that break off the northern point of the bay.  While the surf only breaks big several times a year, Waimea was the most prestigious big wave surf break in the world for decades.  With the advent of tow-in surfing, more and more big wave breaks have been discovered that are far superior in quality to Waimea.  However, the bay still holds a significant place even in today's world of big wave surfing.

The Quiksilver Big Wave Invitational in Memory of Eddie Aikau takes place in Waimea Bay to honor the legendary surfer and the first lifeguard of the North Shore of Oahu. Since its inception in 1984, the tournament has only been held ten times, due to a precondition that open-ocean swells reach a minimum height of  before the competition can be held. The most recent tournament was in January 2023.

On January 28, 1998, Hawaii issued its first ever "condition black" legally closing all North Shore beaches including Waimea Bay. The Quiksilver Big Wave Invitational in Memory of Eddie Aikau was canceled due to above-average behemoth surf.

In popular culture
The 1964 film Ride the Wild Surf and the Jan and Dean song "Ride the Wild Surf", which played at the end of the film and became a Top 20 National hit, made Waimea Bay famous.

Waimea Bay was NOT the primary filming location for the television series Lost, although some scenes may have been shot in the opark in the valley.  an American drama-adventure television series about survivors of a plane crash on a mysterious tropical island. (The downed plane was at Mokuleia at the end of Dillingham airstrip almost to road's end at Kaena Point.) The actual main location and filming area was at Kawailoa Beach, about 1/2 mile north of Pueana Point.

Waimea Bay is mentioned in the 1963 Beach Boys' song Surfin' U.S.A.

Waimea Bay is mentioned in the 1987 cult film Surf Nazis Must Die when Adolf asks a young gang member where the best surfing beaches are. There have been many other Hollywood movies such as "Ride the Wild Surf" and "Big Wednesday" filmed there, as well as many surf movies. Waimea Bay's shorebreak waves, and the large surf off the point have been the topic of many media documentaries and features

See also

Big wave surfing

References

External links
 Google maps satellite image of Waimea Bay

Big wave surfing
Bays of Oahu
Surfing locations in Hawaii
Tourist attractions in Honolulu County, Hawaii